Dhaka Subway is an underground urban rail network being planned in Dhaka, the capital city of Bangladesh, by the Bangladesh Bridge Authority. Dhaka Subway was conceived as a separate transport system to the proposed Dhaka Mass Rapid Transit network, commonly known as Dhaka Metro Rail. In spite of the fact that the Dhaka Subway and the Dhaka Metro Rail are separate systems being planned by different authorities, it is expected that they will be incorporated into a single mass transit system at some point in the future.

History
In August 2018, the BBA appointed a Spanish consulting company to conduct the feasibility study and preliminary design of Dhaka Subway. Initial plan was to construct a subway network of 90km, consisting of four lines, with stations spaced at an average distance of approximately one kilometer. After some feasibility studies, the project was expanded to cover the entire Dhaka with a total length of 238 kilometers. The new routes are yet to be finalized.

A number of geotechnical and geophysical surveys and investigations are to be carried out at a total of 250 locations, with boreholes being drilled at 180 of these. Boreholes are to be drilled at proposed station locations, with seismic CPTu tests to be carried out at intermediate locations between stations. Traffic and transportation surveys, including household interviews, traffic counts, roadside origin/destination surveys, travel time and delay studies, and public transport surveys are also being carried out.

Three more routes are likely to be built by 2030, with the entire network completed by 2041. Questions were raised about the suitability of the subway due to monsoonal flooding and the lack of urban planning.

Routes

Under Construction/planned

See also 
 List of megaprojects in Bangladesh
 Dhaka Metro Rail

References

External links 
Bangladesh Bridge Authority (BBA)
Dhaka Transport Coordination Authority (DTCA)
Dhaka Mass Transit Company Ltd. (DMTCL)
Japan International Cooperation Agency (JICA)

Bangladesh Railway
Public transport in Bangladesh
Transport in Dhaka
Proposed public transport in Asia